Events from the year 1998 in Ireland.

Incumbents
 President: Mary McAleese
 Taoiseach: Bertie Ahern (FF)
 Tánaiste: Mary Harney (PD)
 Minister for Finance: Charlie McCreevy (FF)
 Chief Justice: Liam Hamilton
 Dáil: 28th
 Seanad: 21st

Events
1 January – The Vocational Education Committees of the towns of Bray, Drogheda, Sligo, Tralee and Wexford were abolished.
14 January – The Mahon Planning Tribunal opened in Dublin Castle.
27 February – Ireland qualified for entry into the Economic and Monetary Union of the European Union.
15 March – Former Fine Gael party minister Hugh Coveney died in a fall from a cliff in County Cork.
10 April (Good Friday) – The British and Irish governments and all the political parties in Northern Ireland (except the Democratic Unionists) signed the Belfast Agreement (also called Good Friday Agreement).
24 April - The sixth edition of People in Need Telethon was held. 
22 May – The Good Friday Agreement was endorsed in a referendum by people north and south of the Irish border.
1 July – The new Northern Ireland Assembly first met, in "shadow" form; Reg Empey and Seamus Mallon were elected First Minister and deputy First Minister respectively.
15 August – Omagh bombing: 29 people died in a car bomb explosion near the centre of Omagh, County Tyrone by the Real Irish Republican Army (Real IRA).
4 September – President Bill Clinton of the United States began his second official visit to the island of Ireland (his first being in 1995).
20 September - A new television station called TV3 was launched.
26 November – Tony Blair became the first Prime Minister of the United Kingdom to address the Oireachtas.
30 November – Unemployment fell by 20% with the number of people in work rising by 100,000.
12 December – Members of the Labour Party and Democratic Left agreed to merge.
26 December – Great Boxing Day Storm ('Hurricane Stephen'): Severe gale-force winds hit northwest Ireland causing heavy disruption to services.
31 December – The punt currency was traded for the last time as the euro currency was launched.

Arts and literature
28 February – Actor and comedian Dermot Morgan died suddenly in London.
25 May – Patrick McCabe's novel Breakfast on Pluto was published.
3 July – The boyband Westlife was formed.
28 August – Maeve Binchy's novel Tara Road was published.
20 September – The TV3 television channel went on the air.
7 October – Marina Carr's drama By the Bog of Cats opened at the Abbey Theatre, Dublin.
24 December – Gay Byrne broadcast his final radio show, from St Stephen's Green, Dublin.
John Montague became the first occupant of the Ireland Chair of Poetry.
Garry Hynes became the first woman to win a Tony Award for Best Direction of a Play (The Beauty Queen of Leenane) on Broadway.
Brendan Graham's Great Famine novel The Whitest Flower was published.
Terence Dolan's A Dictionary of Hiberno-English: The Irish Use of English was published.

Sport

Association football
 St Patrick's Athletic won the League of Ireland.
 Cork City FC won the FAI Cup.
 Shelbourne's home UEFA Cup tie against Rangers was moved to England due to fears of sectarian trouble. Despite taking a 3–0 lead, Shelbourne lost 3–5.
8 May – The Irish under-16 team won the European Championship.
26 July - The Irish under-18 team won the European Championship.

Gaelic football
Galway won the All-Ireland Senior Football Championship, beating Kildare in the final.

Golf
Murphy's Irish Open was won by David Carter (England).

Hurling
Offaly won the All-Ireland Senior Hurling Championship for the second time in five years.

Swimming
6 August – Olympic gold medalist Michelle Smith was banned from competition for four years for tampering with a drug test.

Births
 17 March – Nathan O'Toole, actor

Deaths
26 January – Ernest Gébler, writer (b. 1914).
8 February – Niall Sheridan, poet, fiction writer and broadcaster (b. 1912).
28 February – Dermot Morgan, actor and comedian (b. 1952).
15 March – Hugh Coveney, Fine Gael TD and Cabinet Minister, yachtsman (b. 1935).
17 April – Robin Lawler, soccer player (born 1925).
6 May – Sybil Connolly, fashion designer (b. 1921).
22 May – Jim Power, Galway hurler (b. 1894).
26 May – Kate Cruise O'Brien, writer (b. 1948).
23 June
Paul O'Dwyer, lawyer and politician in the United States (b. 1907).
Maureen O'Sullivan, actress (b. 1911).
26 July – Seán Ó hEinirí, fisherman, seanchaí and last known monolingual speaker of the Irish language (b. 1915).
13 August – Liam de Paor, historian and archaeologist (b. 1926).
20 September – Robert Malachy Burke, Christian Socialist and philanthropist (b. 1907).
10 October – Tommy Quaid, Limerick hurler (b. 1957).
11 November – Paddy Clancy, folk singer (b. 1922).
13 November – Valerie Hobson, actress (b. 1917).
21 November – John David Gwynn, cricketer (b. 1907).
26 December – Cathal Goulding, Chief of Staff of the Irish Republican Army and the Official IRA (b. 1923).
Full date unknown – Patrick Hickey, visual artist (b. 1927).

See also
1998 in Irish television

References

External links
 1998 at Reeling in the Years